Sharon Mazer is an academic in New Zealand who is professor of theatre and performance studies at Auckland University of Technology. She is known for her book, Professional Wrestling: Sport and Spectacle, and as a researcher of popular performance.

Academic career 
After completing a BA at Reed College in Portland, Oregon in 1977, Mazer worked for some years as a theatre director. She returned to study, graduating with an MA from University of California, Los Angeles in 1985 and then moving to New York to study at Columbia University for a MPhil in 1989 and a PhD in 1991.

Mazer moved to New Zealand in 1994 to lecture at the University of Canterbury in Christchurch. She joined Auckland University of Technology in 2014, where she was promoted to full professor in November 2019.

Selected works

Books

Articles

References

External links
 
 

Living people
Reed College alumni
University of California, Los Angeles alumni
Columbia University alumni
Academic staff of the University of Canterbury
Academic staff of the Auckland University of Technology
Professional wrestling historians
Professional wrestling journalists and columnists
New Zealand women journalists
Year of birth missing (living people)